Franziska von Känel is a former Swiss curler. She was also a member of the Ott-led Swiss team at the 1997 World Women's Curling Championship which finished 8th.

Teams

References

External links
 

Swiss female curlers
European curling champions
Swiss curling champions
Franziska